Çukurçayır  is a town in the central district (Trabzon) of  Trabzon Province, Turkey. The population of the Çukurçayır was 11077   as of 2011. In 1995 it was declared a seat of township. According to mayor's page a monastery and a bridge are the historically important ruins of the town.

References

Populated places in Trabzon Province
Towns in Turkey
Ortahisar